Nuclear weapons testing is the act of experimentally and deliberately firing one or more nuclear devices in a controlled manner pursuant to a military, scientific or technological goal. This has been done on test sites on land or waters owned, controlled or leased from the owners by one of the eight nuclear nations: the United States, the Soviet Union, the United Kingdom, France, China, India, Pakistan and North Korea, or has been done on or over ocean sites far from territorial waters. There have been 2,121 tests done since the first in July 1945, involving 2,476 nuclear devices. As of 1993, worldwide, 520 atmospheric nuclear explosions (including 8 underwater) have been conducted with a total yield of 545 megaton (Mt): 217 Mt from pure fission and 328 Mt from bombs using fusion, while the estimated number of underground nuclear tests conducted in the period from 1957 to 1992 is 1,352 explosions with a total yield of 90 Mt.

Very few unknown tests are suspected at this time, the Vela incident being the most prominent. Israel is the only country suspected of having nuclear weapons but not known to have ever tested any.

The following are considered nuclear tests:

 single nuclear devices fired in deep horizontal tunnels (drifts) or in vertical shafts, in shallow shafts ("cratering"), underwater, on barges or vessels on the water, on land, in towers, carried by balloons, shot from cannons, dropped from airplanes with or without parachutes, and shot into a ballistic trajectory, into high atmosphere or into near space on rockets. Since 1963 the great majority have been underground due to the Partial Test Ban Treaty.
 Salvo tests in which several devices are fired simultaneously, as defined by international treaties:

 The two nuclear bombs dropped in combat over Japan in 1945. While the primary purpose of these two detonations was military and not experimental, observations were made and the tables would be incomplete without them.
 Nuclear safety tests in which the intended nuclear yield was intended to be zero, and which failed to some extent if a nuclear yield was detected. There have been failures, and therefore they are included in the lists, as well as the successes.
 Fizzles, in which the expected yield was not reached.
 Tests intended but not completed because of vehicle or other support failures that destroyed the device.
 Tests that were emplaced and could not be fired for various reasons. Usually, the devices were ultimately destroyed by later conventional or nuclear explosions.

Not included as nuclear tests:

 Misfires which were corrected and later fired as intended.
 Hydro-nuclear or Subcritical testing in which the normal fuel material for a nuclear device is below the amount necessary to sustain a chain reaction. The line here is finely drawn, but, among other things, subcritical testing is not prohibited by the Comprehensive Nuclear Test Ban Treaty, while safety tests are.

Tests by country
The table in this section summarizes all worldwide nuclear testing (including the two bombs dropped in combat which were not tests). The country names are links to summary articles for each country, which may in turn be used to drill down to test series articles which contain details on every known nuclear explosion and test. The notes attached to various table cells detail how the numbers therein are arrived at.

Known tests
In the following subsections, a selection of significant tests (by no means exhaustive) is listed, representative of the testing effort in each nuclear country.

United States 

The standard "official" list of tests for American devices is arguably the United States Department of Energy DoE-209 document. The United States conducted around 1,054 nuclear tests (by official count) between 1945 and 1992, including 216 atmospheric, underwater, and space tests. Some significant tests conducted by the United States include:

 The Trinity test on 16 July 1945, near Socorro, New Mexico, was the first-ever test of a nuclear weapon (yield of around 20 kilotons).
 The Operation Crossroads series in July 1946, at Bikini Atoll in the Marshall Islands, was the first postwar test series and one of the largest military operations in U.S. history.
 The Operation Greenhouse shots of May 1951, at Enewetak Atoll in the Marshall Islands, included the first boosted fission weapon test (named Item) and a scientific test (named George) which proved the feasibility of thermonuclear weapons.
 The Ivy Mike shot of 1 November 1952, at Enewetak Atoll, was the first full test of a Teller-Ulam design "staged" hydrogen bomb, with a yield of 10 megatons. This was not a deployable weapon. With its full cryogenic equipment it weighed about 82 tons. 
 The Castle Bravo shot of 1 March 1954, at Bikini Atoll, was the first test of a deployable (solid fuel) thermonuclear weapon, and also (accidentally) the largest weapon ever tested by the United States (15 megatons). It was also the single largest U.S. radiological accident in connection with nuclear testing. The unanticipated yield, and a change in the weather, resulted in nuclear fallout spreading eastward onto the inhabited Rongelap and Rongerik atolls, which were soon evacuated. Many of the Marshall Islands natives have since suffered from birth defects and have received some compensation from the federal government of the United States. A Japanese fishing boat, the Daigo Fukuryū Maru, also came into contact with the fallout, which caused many of the crew to grow ill; one eventually died. The crew's exposure was referenced in the film Godzilla as a criticism of American nuclear tests in the Pacific.
 The Operation Plumbbob series of May - October 1957 is considered the biggest, longest, and most controversial test series that occurred within the continental United States. Rainier Mesa, Frenchman Flat, and Yucca Flat were all used for the 29 different atmospheric explosions.
 Shot Argus I of Operation Argus, on 27 August 1958, was the first detonation of a nuclear weapon in outer space when a 1.7-kiloton warhead was detonated at 200 kilometers altitude over the South Atlantic Ocean during a series of high-altitude nuclear explosions.
 Shot Frigate Bird of Operation Dominic on 6 May 1962, was the only U.S. test of an operational ballistic missile with a live nuclear warhead (yield of 600 kilotons), at Johnston Atoll in the Pacific. In general, missile systems were tested without live warheads and warheads were tested separately for safety concerns. In the early 1960s there were mounting questions about how the systems would behave under combat conditions (when they were "mated", in military parlance), and this test was meant to dispel these concerns. However, the warhead had to be somewhat modified before its use, and the missile was only a SLBM (and not an ICBM), so by itself, it did not satisfy all concerns.
 Shot Sedan of Operation Storax on 6 July 1962 (yield of 104 kilotons), was an attempt at showing the feasibility of using nuclear weapons for civilian, peaceful purposes as part of Operation Plowshare. In this instance, a 1280-feet-in-diameter and 320-feet-deep explosion crater, morphologically similar to an impact crater, was created at the Nevada Test Site.
 Shot Divider of Operation Julin on 23 September 1992, at the Nevada Test Site, was the last U.S. nuclear test. Described as a "test to ensure safety of deterrent forces", the series was interrupted by the beginning of negotiations over the Comprehensive Nuclear-Test-Ban Treaty.

Soviet Union

After the fall of the USSR, the American government (as a member of the International Consortium "International Science and Technology Center") hired a number of top scientists in Sarov (aka Arzamas-16, the Soviet equivalent of Los Alamos and thus sometimes called "Los Arzamas") to draft a number of documents about the history of the Soviet atomic program. One of the documents was the definitive list of Soviet nuclear tests. Most of the tests have no code names, unlike the American tests, so they are known by their test numbers from this document. Some list compilers have detected discrepancies in that list; one device was abandoned in its cove in a tunnel in Semipalatinsk when the Soviets abandoned Kazakhstan, and one list lists 13 other tests which apparently failed to provide any yield. The source for that was the well respected Russian Strategic Nuclear Forces which confirms 11 of the 13; those 11 are in the Wikipedia lists.

The Soviet Union conducted 715 nuclear tests (by the official count) between 1949 and 1990, including 219 atmospheric, underwater, and space tests. Most of them took place at the Semipalatinsk Test Site in Kazakhstan and the Northern Test Site at Novaya Zemlya. Additional industrial tests were conducted at various locations in Russia and Kazakhstan, while a small number of tests were conducted in Ukraine, Uzbekistan, and Turkmenistan.

In addition, the large-scale military exercise was conducted by Soviet army to explore the possibility of defensive and offensive warfare operations on the nuclear battlefield. The exercise, under code name of "Snezhok" (Snowball), involved detonation of a nuclear bomb twice as powerful as the one used in Nagasaki and approximately 45,000 soldiers coming through the epicenter immediately after the blast The exercise was conducted on September 14, 1954, under command of Marshal Georgy Zhukov to the north of Totskoye village in Orenburg Oblast, Russia.

Some significant Soviet tests include:
 Operation First Lightning/RDS-1 (known as Joe 1 in the West), August 29, 1949: first Soviet nuclear test.
 RDS-6s (known as Joe 4 in the West), August 12, 1953: first Soviet thermonuclear test using a sloyka (layer cake) design. The design proved to be unscalable into megaton yields, but it was air-deployable.
 RDS-37, November 22, 1955: first Soviet multi-megaton, "true" hydrogen bomb test using Andrei Sakharov's "third idea", essentially a re-invention of the Teller-Ulam.
 Tsar Bomba, October 30, 1961: largest nuclear weapon ever detonated, with a design yield of 100 Mt, de-rated to 50 Mt for the test drop.
 Chagan, January 15, 1965: large cratering experiment as part of Nuclear Explosions for the National Economy program, which created an artificial lake.

The last Soviet test took place on October 24, 1990. After the dissolution of the USSR in 1992, Russia inherited the USSR's nuclear stockpile, while Kazakhstan inherited the Semipalatinsk nuclear test area, as well as the Baikonur Cosmodrome, the Sary Shagan missile/radar test area and three ballistic missile fields. Semipalatinsk included at least the one unexploded device, later blown up with conventional explosives by a combined US–Kazakh team. No testing has occurred in the former territory of the USSR since its dissolution.

United Kingdom

The United Kingdom has conducted 45 tests (12 in Australian territory, including 3 in the Montebello Islands of Western Australia and 9 in mainland South Australia (7 at Maralinga and 2 at Emu Field); 9 in the Line Islands of the central Pacific (3 at Malden Island and 6 at Kiritimati/Christmas Island); and 24 in the U.S. as part of joint test series). Often excluded from British totals are the 31 safety tests of Operation Vixen in Maralinga. British test series include:
 Operation Hurricane, October 3, 1952 (first atomic bomb)
 Operation Totem, 1953
 Operation Mosaic, 1956
 Operation Buffalo, 1956
 Operation Antler, 1957
 Operation Grapple, 1957–1958 (Included the first hydrogen bomb, Grapple X/Round C)

Last test: Julin Bristol, November 26, 1991, vertical shaft.

Atmospheric tests involving nuclear material but conventional explosions:
 Operation Kittens, 1953–1961 (initiator tests using conventional explosive)
 Operation Rats, 1956–1960 (conventional explosions to study dispersal of uranium)
 Operation Tims, 1955–1963 (conventional explosions for tamper, plutonium compression trials)
 Operation Vixen, 1959–1963 (effects of accidental fire or explosion on nuclear weapons)

France 

France conducted 210 nuclear tests between February 13, 1960 and January 27, 1996. Four were tested at Reggane, French Algeria, 13 at In Ekker, Algeria and the rest at Moruroa and Fangataufa Atolls in French Polynesia. Often skipped in lists are the 5 safety tests at Adrar Tikertine in Algeria.
 Operation Gerboise bleue, February 13, 1960 (first atomic bomb) and three more: Reggane, Algeria; in the atmosphere; final test reputed to be more intended to prevent the weapon from falling into the hands of generals rebelling against French colonial rule than for testing purposes.
 Operation Agathe, November 7, 1961 and 12 more: In Ekker, Algeria; underground
 Operation Aldébaran, July 2, 1966 and 45 more: Moruroa and Fangataufa; in the atmosphere;
 Canopus first hydrogen bomb: August 28, 1968 (Fangataufa)
 Operation Achille June 5, 1975 and 146 more: Moruroa and Fangataufa; underground
 Operation Xouthos last test: January 27, 1996 (Fangataufa)

China

The foremost list of Chinese tests compiled by the Federation of American Scientists skips over two Chinese tests listed by others. The People's Republic of China conducted 45 tests (23 atmospheric and 22 underground, all conducted at Lop Nur Nuclear Weapons Test Base, in Malan, Xinjiang)
 596 First test – October 16, 1964
 Film is now available of 1966 tests here at time 09:00 and another test later in this film.
 Test No. 6, First hydrogen bomb test – June 17, 1967
 CHIC-16, 200 kt-1 Mt atmospheric test – June 17, 1974
 #21, Largest hydrogen bomb tested by China (4 megatons) - November 17, 1976
 #29, Last atmospheric test – October 16, 1980. This would also be the last atmospheric nuclear test by any country
 #45, Last test – July 29, 1996, underground.

India

India announced it had conducted a test of a single device in 1974 near Pakistan's eastern border under the codename Operation Smiling Buddha. After 24 years, India publicly announced five further nuclear tests on May 11 and May 13, 1998. The official number of Indian nuclear tests is six, conducted under two different code-names and at different times.
 May 18, 1974: Operation Smiling Buddha (type: implosion, plutonium and underground). One underground test in a horizontal shaft around 107 m long under the long-constructed Indian Army Pokhran Test Range (IA-PTR) in the Thar Desert, eastern border of Pakistan. The Indian Meteorological Department and the Atomic Energy Commission announced the yield of the weapon at 12 kt. Other Western sources claimed the yield to be around 2–12 kt. However, the claim was dismissed by the Bulletin of the Atomic Scientists and it was later reported to be 8 kt.
 May 11, 1998: Operation Shakti (type: implosion, 3 uranium and 2 plutonium devices, all underground). The Atomic Energy Commission (AEC) of India and the Defence Research and Development Organisation (DRDO) simultaneously conducted a test of three nuclear devices at the Indian Army Pokhran Test Range (IAPTR) on May 11, 1998. Two days later, on May 13, the AEC and DRDO carried out a test of two further nuclear devices, detonated simultaneously. During this operation, AEC India claimed to have tested a three-stage thermonuclear device (Teller-Ulam design), but the yield of the tests was significantly lower than that expected from thermonuclear devices. The yields remain questionable, at best, by Western and Indian scholars, estimated at 45 kt; scale down of 200 kt model.

Pakistan

Pakistan conducted 6 official tests, under 2 different code names, in the final week of May 1998. From 1983 to 1994, around 24 nuclear cold tests were carried out by Pakistan; these remained unannounced and classified until 2000. In May 1998, Pakistan responded publicly by testing 6 nuclear devices.
 March 11, 1983: Kirana-I (type: implosion, non-fissioned (plutonium) and underground). The 24 underground cold tests of nuclear devices were performed near the Sargodha Air Force Base.
 May 28, 1998: Chagai-I (type: implosion, HEU and underground). One underground horizontal-shaft tunnel test (inside a granite mountain) of boosted fission devices at Koh Kambaran in the Ras Koh Hills in Chagai District of Balochistan Province. The announced yield of the five devices was a total of 40–45 kilotonnes with the largest having a yield of approximately 30–45 kilotonnes. An independent assessment however put the test yield at no more than 12 kt and the maximum yield of a single device at only 9 kt as opposed to 35 kt as claimed by Pakistani authorities. According to The Bulletin of the Atomic Scientists, the maximum yield was only 2–10 kt as opposed to the claim of 35 kt and the total yield of all tests was no more than 8–15 kt.
 May 30, 1998: Chagai-II (type: implosion, plutonium device and underground). One underground vertical-shaft tunnel test of a miniaturized fission device having an announced yield of approximately 18–20 kilotonnes, carried out in the Kharan Desert in Kharan District, Balochistan Province. An independent assessment put the figure of this test at 4–6 kt only. Some Western seismologists put the figure at a mere 2 kt.

North Korea

On October 9, 2006, North Korea announced they had conducted a nuclear test in North Hamgyong Province on the northeast coast at 10:36 AM (11:30 AEST). There was a 3.58 magnitude earthquake reported in South Korea, and a 4.2 magnitude tremor was detected 386 km (240 mi) north of P'yongyang. The low estimates on the yield of the test—potentially less than a kiloton in strength—have led to speculation as to whether it was a fizzle (unsuccessful test), or not a genuine nuclear test at all.

On May 25, 2009, North Korea announced having conducted a second nuclear test. A tremor, with magnitude reports ranging from 4.7 to 5.3, was detected at Mantapsan, 375 km (233 mi) northeast of P'yongyang and within a few kilometers of the 2006 test location. While estimates, as to yield, are still uncertain, with reports ranging from 3 to 20 kilotons, the stronger tremor indicates a significantly larger yield than the 2006 test.

On 12 February 2013, North Korean state media announced it had conducted an underground nuclear test, its third in seven years. A tremor that exhibited a nuclear bomb signature with an initial magnitude 4.9 (later revised to 5.1) was detected by both Comprehensive Nuclear-Test-Ban Treaty Organization Preparatory Commission (CTBTO) and the United States Geological Survey (USGS). The tremor occurred at 11:57 local time (02:57 UTC) and the USGS said the hypocenter of the event was only one kilometer deep. South Korea's defense ministry said the event reading indicated a blast of six to seven kilotons. However, there are some experts who estimate the yield to be up to 15 kt, since the test site's geology is not well understood. In comparison, the atomic (fission) bombs dropped by the Enola Gay on Hiroshima (Little Boy, a "gun-type" atomic bomb) and on Nagasaki by Bockscar (Fat Man, an "implosion-type" atomic bomb) had blast yields of the equivalents of 15 and 21 kilotons of TNT, respectively.

On January 5, 2015, North Korean TV news anchors announced that they had successfully tested a "miniaturized atomic bomb", about 8 km (5 mi) from the Punggye-ri nuclear site where a test was conducted in 2013.

On January 6, 2016, North Korea announced that it conducted a successful test of a hydrogen bomb. The seismic event, at a magnitude of 5.1, occurred 19 kilometers (12 miles) east-northeast of Sungjibaegam.

On September 9, 2016, North Korea announced another successful nuclear weapon test at the Punggye-ri Test Site. This is the first warhead the state claims to be able to mount to a missile or long-range rocket previously tested in June 2016. Estimates for the explosive yield range from 20 to 30 kt and coincided with a 5.3 magnitude earthquake in the region.

On September 3, 2017, North Korea successfully detonated its first weapon self-designated as a hydrogen bomb. Initial yield estimates place it at 100 kt. Reports indicate that the test blast caused a magnitude 6.3 earthquake, and possibly resulted in a cave-in at the test site.

Alleged tests
There have been a number of significant alleged/disputed/unacknowledged accounts of countries testing nuclear explosives. Their status is either not certain or entirely disputed by most mainstream experts.

China
On April 15, 2020 U.S. officials said China may have conducted low-yield nuclear weapon tests in its Lop Nur test site.

Israel
Israel was alleged by a Bundeswehr report to have made an underground test in 1963. Historian Taysir Nashif reported a zero yield implosion test in 1966.<ref>Nuclear Weapons in the Middle East: Dimensions and Responsibilities, by Taysir Nashif</ref> Scientists from Israel participated in the earliest French nuclear tests before DeGaulle cut off further cooperation.

North Korea

On September 9, 2004, South Korean media reported that there had been a large explosion at the Chinese/North Korean border. This explosion left a crater visible by satellite and precipitated a large (3-km diameter) mushroom cloud. The United States and South Korea quickly downplayed this, explaining it away as a forest fire that had nothing to do with the DPRK's nuclear weapons program.

North Korea has conducted six nuclear tests, in 2006, 2009, 2013, twice in 2016, and 2017. The 3 September 2017 test, like their January 2016 test, is claimed to be a hydrogen bomb (but may only be a boosted fission weapon rather than an actual staged Teller–Ulam thermonuclear weapon).

Pakistan
Because Pakistan's nuclear program was conducted under extreme secrecy, it raised concerns in the Soviet Union and India, who suspected that since the 1974 test it was inevitable that Pakistan would further develop its program. The pro-Soviet newspaper, The Patriot, reported that "Pakistan has exploded a nuclear device in the range of 20 to 50 kilotons" in 1983. But it was widely dismissed by Western diplomats as it was pointed out that The Patriot had previously engaged in spreading disinformation on several occasions. In 1983, India and the Soviet Union both investigated secret tests but, due to lack of any scientific data, these statements were widely dismissed.

In their book, The Nuclear Express, authors Thomas Reed and Danny Stillman also allege that the People's Republic of China allowed Pakistan to detonate a nuclear weapon at its Lop Nur test site in 1990, eight years before Pakistan held its first official weapons test.

However, senior scientist Abdul Qadeer Khan strongly rejected the claim in May 1998. According to Khan, due to its sensitivity, no country allows another country to use their test site to explode the devices. Such an agreement only existed between the United States and the United Kingdom since the 1958 US–UK Mutual Defense Agreement which among other things allows Britain access to the American Nevada National Security Site for testing. Dr. Samar Mubarakmand, another senior scientist, also confirmed Dr. Khan's statement and acknowledged that cold tests were carried out, under codename Kirana-I, in a test site which was built by the Corps of Engineers under the guidance of the PAEC.
Additionally, the UK conducted nuclear tests in Australia in the 1950s.

Russia
The Yekaterinburg Fireball of November 14, 2014, is alleged by some to have been a nuclear test in space, which would not have been detected by the CTBTO because the CTBTO does not have autonomous ways to monitor space nuclear tests (i.e. satellites) and relies thus on information that member States would accept to provide. The fireball happened a few days before a conference in Yekaterinburg on the theme of air/missile defense. The affirmation, however, is disputed as the Russian Ministry of Emergency Situations claimed it was an "on-ground" explosion. The Siberian Times, a local newspaper, noted that "the light was not accompanied by any sound".

Vela incident
The Vela incident was an unidentified double flash of light detected by a partly functional, decommissioned American Vela Satellite on September 22, 1979, in the Indian Ocean (near the Prince Edward Islands off Antarctica). Sensors which could have recorded proof of a nuclear test were not functioning on this satellite. It is possible that this was produced by a nuclear device. If this flash detection was actually a nuclear test, a popular theory favored in the diary of then sitting American President Jimmy Carter, is that it resulted from a covert joint South African and Israeli nuclear test of an advanced highly miniaturized Israeli artillery shell sized device which was unintentionally detectable by satellite optical sensor due to a break in the cloud cover of a typhoon. Analysis of the South African nuclear program later showed only six of the crudest and heavy designs weighing well over 340 kg had been built when they finally declared and disarmed their nuclear arsenal. The 1986 Vanunu leaks analyzed by nuclear weapon miniaturization pioneer Ted Taylor revealed very sophisticated miniaturized Israeli designs among the evidence presented. Also suspected were France testing a neutron bomb near their Kerguelen Islands territory, the Soviet Union making a prohibited atmospheric test,Bulletin of the Atomic Scientists Jan 1985 p33 as well as India or Pakistan doing initial proof of concept tests of early weaponized nuclear bombs.

Tests of live warheads on rockets

Missiles and nuclear warheads have usually been tested separately because testing them together is considered highly dangerous; they are certainly the most extreme type of live fire exercise. The only US live test of an operational missile was the following:

Other live tests with the nuclear explosive delivered by rocket by the USA include:
 The July 19, 1957 test Plumbbob/John fired a small yield nuclear weapon on an AIR-2 Genie air-to-air rocket from a jet fighter.
Both were part of Operation Hardtack I and had a yield of 3.75 Mt
 Operation Argus: three tests above the South Atlantic Ocean, August 27, August 30, and September 6, 1958
 On July 9, 1962, Thor missile launched a Mk4 reentry vehicle containing a W49 thermonuclear warhead to an altitude of 248 miles (400 km). The warhead detonated with a yield of 1.45 Mt. This was the Starfish Prime event of nuclear test operation Dominic-Fishbowl In the Dominic-Fishbowl series in 1962: Checkmate, Bluegill, Kingfish and Tightrope''
The USA also conducted two live weapons test involving nuclear artillery including:
 Test of the M65 atomic cannon using the W9 artillery shell during the Upshot-Knothole Grable test on May 25, 1953.
 Test of the Davy Crockett recoilless gun during Little Feller I test on July 17, 1962. 
The USA also conducted one live weapons test involving a missile launched nuclear depth charge:
 Test of the RUR-5 ASROC during the Dominic-Swordfish test on May 11, 1962.

The Soviet Union tested nuclear explosives on rockets as part of their development of a localized anti-ballistic missile system in the 1960s. Some of the Soviet nuclear tests with warheads delivered by rocket include:
 Baikal (USSR Test #25, February 2, 1956, at Aralsk) – one test, with a R-5M rocket launch from Kapustin Yar.
 ZUR-215 (#34, January 19, 1957, at Kapustin Yar) – one test, with a rocket launch from Kapustin Yar.
 (#82 and 83, early November 1958) two tests, done after declared cease-fire for test moratorium negotiations, from Kapustin Yar.
 Groza (#88, September 6, 1961, at Kapustin Yar) – one test, with a rocket launch from Kapustin Yar.
 Grom (#115, October 6, 1961, at Kapustin Yar) – one test, with a rocket launch from Kapustin Yar.
 Volga (#106 and 108, September 20–22, 1961, at Novaya Zemlya) – two tests, with R-11M rockets launch from Rogachevo.
 Roza (#94 and 99, September 12–16, 1961, at Novaya Zemlya) – two tests, with R-12 rockets launch from Vorkuta.
 Raduga (#121, October 20, 1961, at Novaya Zemlya) – one test, with a R-13 rocket launch.
 Tyulpan (#164, September 8, 1962, at Novaya Zemlya) – one test, with R-14 rockets launched from Chita.
 Operation K (1961 and 1962, at Sary-Shagan) – five tests, at high altitude, with rockets launched from Kapustin Yar.
The Soviet Union also conducted three live nuclear torpedo tests including:
 Test of the T-5 torpedo on September 21, 1955 at Novaya Zemlya.
 Test of the T-5 torpedo on October 10, 1957 at Novaya Zemlya.
 Test of the T-5 torpedo on October 23, 1961 at Novaya Zemlya.

The People's Republic of China conducted CHIC-4 with a Dongfeng-2 rocket launch on October 25, 1966. The warhead exploded with a yield of 12 kt.

Most powerful tests
The following is a list of the most powerful nuclear weapon tests. All tests on the first chart were multi-stage thermonuclear weapons.

See also

 Andrei Sakharov
 Edward Teller
 High explosive nuclear effects testing
 Historical nuclear weapons stockpiles and nuclear tests by country
 International Day against Nuclear Tests
 J. Robert Oppenheimer
 Largest artificial non-nuclear explosions
 List of nuclear weapon test locations
 List of nuclear weapons tests of China
 Lists of nuclear disasters and radioactive incidents
 Novaya Zemlya
 Nuclear fallout
 Nuclear Test Ban
 Soviet atomic bomb project
 Stanislaw Ulam

References

External links
 United States Nuclear Tests July 1945 through September 1992
 Australian Government — Geoscience Australia — database of nuclear explosions since 1945
 Video archive of nuclear weapon testing 
 Nuclear Proliferation Archive
 

History-related lists
Nuclear technology-related lists